A. Marimuthu was an Indian politician and former Member of the Legislative Assembly of Tamil Nadu. He was elected to the Tamil Nadu Legislative Assembly as an Indian National Congress candidate from Aduthurai Assembly constituency in the 1967 Tamil Nadu state assembly election.

References

Indian National Congress politicians from Tamil Nadu
living people
Tamil Nadu MLAs 1967–1972
year of birth missing (living people)